Lake Nicolet (in French: lac Nicolet) is located 50 km south of Victoriaville, in the municipality of Saints-Martyrs-Canadiens, in Arthabaska Regional County Municipality (MRC), in administrative region of Centre-du-Québec, Canada.

Lake Nicolet is the source of the Nicolet River which flows  to the southeast shore of lake Saint-Pierre, in Nicolet. The latest is crossed through the North-East by the St. Lawrence River.

This lake is surrounded by Chemin du Lac-Nicolet (north-west side) and Chemin Gosford-Sud (south-east side).

Geography 

It has seven islands: Boulanger, Baril, Linke, L'Heureux, à Michel-Rheault, Rolland and a little unnamed island. This lake has a hundred chalets all around.

Toponymy 
The toponym "Lac Nicolet" was made official on December 5, 1968, at the Commission de toponymie du Québec.

See also 
Nicolet River
Centre-du-Québec, administrative region

References 

Lakes of Centre-du-Québec
Arthabaska Regional County Municipality